Hezekiah Frith, Sr. (1763–1848) was an 18th-century British ship owner with the reputation of a "gentleman privateer", who engaged in piracy during the 1790s. One of the richest men in Bermuda during the late 18th and early 19th centuries, he built the Spithead House in Warwick, Bermuda.

He was married three times, his daughters all marrying Presbyterian ministers; his son Hezekiah Frith, Jr. became a prominent religious figure. Brother and sister Heather Nova and Mishka, two popular Bermudian singers and songwriters, are descendants of Frith.

Biography

Born in Bermuda, he was one of seven children born to Captain William Frith and Sarah Lee. As a successful shipowner during the 1780s and 1790s, he became engaged in privateering and smuggling, from which he reportedly made his fortune. As was normal practise in Bermuda, he often mixed slaves and free men in his crews. In August 1796 he slipped into the French port of Cap Français at San Domingo during the night and stole away a captured British transport ship.

His colourful piratical career may very likely be exaggerated. Participating in a number of privateering expeditions with the Royal Navy, he is supposed to have hoarded treasure from at least two captured ships in the store he operated next to the Spithead House; he supposedly used the water tank at Spithead to smuggle captured goods and other valuable items before filing claim at the Customs House. Frith is also claimed to have rescued (or kidnapped) a Frenchwoman, whom he kept there as a mistress: both are said to haunt the house, according to local lore. The house would later be owned successively by dramatist Eugene O'Neill, Sir Noël Coward and Charlie Chaplin.

The Granaway home on Harbor Road, which he had built for his daughter, was later bought by a family of free blacks descended from a slave named Caprice, who had originally been brought to Bermuda on a ship captured by Hezekiah Frith on one of his voyages. Adele Tucker, a well-known Bermudian educator and co-founder of Bermuda Union of Teachers, grew up in the home.

References

Further reading
Kennedy, Jean de Chantal. Biography of a Colonial Town, Hamilton, Bermuda, 1790–1897. Hamilton: Bermuda Books, 1961.
Kennedy, Jean de Chantal. Frith of Bermuda, Gentleman Privateer: a biography of Hezekiah Frith, 1763–1848. Hamilton: Bermuda Books, 1964.
Wilkinson, Henry Campbell. Bermuda from Sail to Steam: The History of the Island from 1784 to 1901. London: Oxford University Press, 1973.

External links
WhoBegatWho.com – Hezekiah Frith
RootsWeb: Frith-L Archives, Frith, Capt. Hezekiah

1763 births
1848 deaths
British businesspeople
British privateers
Bermudian businesspeople
People from Warwick Parish
19th-century pirates